

Introduction 
Crawford & Company is based in Atlanta, Georgia, United States. this company is the world's largest independent provider of claims management's and outsourcing solutions to brokers, carriers, and corporates, with global network serving clients in more than 70 countries.
Crawford & Company is a claims management company with more than 700 offices in 70 countries.

Overview
Based in Atlanta, Georgia, Crawford & Company is one of the world's largest independent providers of claims management to the risk management and insurance industry as well as self-insured entities, with clients in more than 70 countries. Jim Crawford, formerly an insurance company claims manager, founded Crawford & Company in 1941. On May 27, 1941, he opened the first Crawford office in Columbus, Georgia. From that point, Crawford expanded its operations across the United States. These offices handled casualty and workers' compensation claims for all major insurance carriers. By 1967, Crawford & Company had offices in Canada, Puerto Rico, England, and the United States.

In 1968, Crawford became a publicly traded company. In 1971, a new 24/7 claims referral service called MAYDAY was introduced, (now "Crawford Claims Alert"). Around the same time, Crawford introduced 3 new services: Rehabilitation Services, Risk Management Services, and Catastrophe Services.

The company's shares are traded on the NYSE under the symbols CRD-A and CRD-B.

References

External links 
 The Crawford Solution
 Official page of Crawfords & Company

Companies listed on the New York Stock Exchange
Insurance companies of the United States
Financial services companies established in 1941
Companies based in Atlanta
1941 establishments in Georgia (U.S. state)
American companies established in 1941